Jamie Foster Brown (ca. June 26, 1946) is the former owner and publisher of Sister 2 Sister magazine, which ran from 1988 to 2014. Newsweek called it the "African-American version of People magazine." As an entertainment journalist, Brown wrote a regular column in her magazine, called "Meow", and through it and her interviews with celebrities, she became the first nationally known black female gossip columnist.

Personal
Jamie Foster Brown's hometown is Chicago, Illinois. Brown and her sister Stella Foster were raised in an Englewood, Chicago neighborhood. Her parents were Peter James and Mamie Lee Foster and they were neighborhood storekeepers. She was educated at Calumet High School, started college in Chicago, and later transferred and then graduated with a B.A. from Stockholm University. Her sister Stella Foster also wrote for Sister 2 Sister magazine, worked with Irv Kupcinet, an entertainment journalist at the Chicago Sun-Times, and after his death wrote her own column and retired in 2012.

She was married to Dr. Lorenzo Brown, a former economist, from 1970 until his death in 2015. The family made Stockholm, Sweden their home for nine years while the couple had two sons, Randy and Russell, and Foster attended university. Her son Randy was wounded by gunfire in 1992 when he was 17 years old, and Foster appeared on NBC's America the Violent with Tom Brokaw to discuss the issue of violence from a parent's perspective. Her husband and two sons worked for the magazine.

Career
Jamie Foster Brown once worked with the Chicago-based Zenith Radio Company.

In 1979, Brown started a ticket company, Washington Theater Group. She then worked for Robert Johnson's Black Entertainment Television (BET), first in advertising as a secretary and then later was promoted to a TV producer for Video Soul and Video LP programs until leaving in 1987. As a TV producer, Brown had met musical talent, such as Whitney Houston and others, and would later use her contacts for her entertainment reporting. Brown has said in interviews that she is not a writer but an interviewer and storyteller, and she wanted to write stories about how celebrities were made. Brown formed the idea for her own magazine while writing for Impact magazine and other publications.

Jamie Foster Brown has owned and published Sister 2 Sister magazine since its launch in 1988. Her magazine was published from Lanham, Maryland and later from Takoma Park, Maryland. Expanding on the brand, Brown created and serves as an entertainment journalist for the syndicated radio program Sister 2 Sister Celebrity Update While at Sister 2 Sister, Brown was a regular guest on the Joan Rivers Show and on the Tom Joyner Morning Show.

Notable works of journalism
Jamie Foster Brown is known for interviewing her subjects in-depth and not presenting black celebrities as superficial.

Interview with Marion Barry
 She is known for her interview that appeared Sister 2 Sister magazine with former Washington, D.C. mayor Marion S. Barry. In the interview, Barry discusses how he has handled the mix of power and women., a Highbeam source,

Milli Vanilli
 She is known for her reporting about the musical group Milli Vanilli's lip syncing recordings and performances.

DMX interview
In 2008, a judge ordered rap artist DMX to pay 1.5 million to Monique Wayne because of a comment he had made to Jamie Foster Brown in a 2006 interview for Sister 2 Sister magazine alleging that a woman had raped him and given birth to his child. Her original suit was for "defamation, false statements and 'unreasonable publicity' about her private life".

Michael Jackson
 Jamie Foster Brown was interviewed about Michael Jackson and she said that his children were well adjusted and that Jackson seemed like a good father to her.

In popular culture
Jamie Foster Brown appeared on the cover of the November 2013 issue of Sister 2 Sister magazine as it celebrated its 25th anniversary, and was interviewed.

Awards
 Midwest Radio and Music Association's Lifetime Achievement Award, 1998
 National Association of Black Female Executives in Music & Entertainment, Shero Hall of Fame, 2002 inductee
 Golden Scissors (black hair style), Lifetime Achievement Award, 2002
 Association for Women in Communications, Matrix Award for Professional Achievement, 2004
 Bennett College, honorary doctorate, 2008
 Ford Motor Co., Freedom Sisters Award, 2009

Selected writings
 Shabazz, Betty, and Jamie Foster Brown. 1998. Betty Shabazz: a sisterfriends' tribute in words and pictures. New York: Simon & Schuster.

References

External links
 Sister 2 Sister magazine
 Meet Jamie Foster Brown
  (Sister 2 Sister channel)

1946 births
Living people
African-American journalists
African-American publishers (people)
American publishers (people)
American gossip columnists
American women columnists
Businesspeople from Chicago
Writers from Chicago
Stockholm University alumni
21st-century African-American people
21st-century African-American women
20th-century African-American people
20th-century African-American women